Alexei Fyodorovich Karamazov, usually referred to simply as Alyosha, is the protagonist in the 1880 novel The Brothers Karamazov by Fyodor Dostoevsky. He is the youngest of the Karamazov brothers, being nineteen years old at the start of the novel. The preface and the opening chapter proclaim him as the hero. Dostoevsky intended to write a sequel, which would detail the rest of Alyosha's life, but died shortly after the publication of The Brothers Karamazov.

At the outset of the story Alyosha is a novice in the local monastery. In this way Alyosha's beliefs act as a counterbalance to his brother Ivan's atheism. He is sent out into the world by his Elder and subsequently becomes embroiled in the sordid details of his family's life. He becomes involved with, and later engaged to, a young girl named Liza (or Lise) Khokhlakov, daughter to a confidante of Katerina Ivanovna's. Later on in the novel, Lise sinks into depression and self-hatred, spurning her lover and crushing her finger in a door. Alyosha is also involved in a side story in which he befriends a group of school boys whose fate adds a hopeful message to the conclusion of an otherwise tragic novel. Alyosha's place in the novel is usually that of a messenger or witness to the actions of his brothers and others. He is very close to Dmitri.

Alyosha is depicted as a positive character, kind, loving and sensitive. Predrag Cicovacki states that Alyosha, like Prince Myshkin, the protagonist in another Dostoyevsky novel, The Idiot, are almost Jesus-like characters, who are nevertheless unable to prevent the suffering of those around them. He suggests that as a witness or messenger, Alyosha is not a true moral agent, playing a passive role in the events of the novel.

Rufus W. Mathewson states that Alyosha Karamazov is a more robust positive hero than Prince Myshkin. He describes Alyosha as relying on forgiveness, kindness and natural justice, rather than attempting to change the social order.

Concept and creation
Alyosha is named after Dostoevsky's son of the same name, who was born in 1875 but died in 1878 of epilepsy. Because of this Dostoevsky imbued Alyosha with qualities and characteristics which he sought and most admired, including that of Jesus Christ. Dostoevsky is believed to have based the character of Alyosha on his friend, Vladimir Solovyov, a Russian philosopher and poet who led a generous life, to the point of giving away his clothes to people in the street.

Portrayals
Hermann Thimig is the first actor to play Alyosha in film in 1915's The Brothers Karamazov directed by Victor Tourjansky, now a lost film.
Italian actor Carlo Conso portrayed the character in the 1947 Italian film I fratelli Karamazoff
Canadian-American actor William Shatner portrays Alyosha in the 1958 American film adaptation.
Russian actor Andrey Myagkov in the Soviet 1969 adaptation.
Russian actor Aleksandr Golubev portrayed Alyosha in the 2009 Russian TV miniseries Bratya Karamazovy.

References

External links

The Brothers Karamazov
Fyodor Dostoyevsky characters
Fictional Christian monks
Fictional Russian people in literature
Male characters in literature
Literary characters introduced in 1880